Amjad Khan (born 14 October 1980) is an international cricketer and barrister. Born in Denmark, he represents the country of his birth in international cricket, while also playing a single Test and Twenty20 International for England in 2009. In a county cricket career lasting over a decade, he played for Kent and Sussex.

Early life
Khan was born in Frederiksberg, a suburb of Copenhagen. He is the son of Pakistani parents Aslam and Raisa, who immigrated to Denmark in the 1970s.

Khan took up cricket at the age of six and played his early cricket for Kjøbenhavns Boldklub. As a teenager, he was regarded as one of the quickest bowlers in Denmark.

English county cricket
Khan was brought to the attention of Kent County Cricket Club by Ole Mortensen, a friend and former teammate of Kent coach John Wright. In his first full season at Kent County Cricket Club, in 2002, he claimed 63 wickets. He failed to regain his form for the next two seasons, taking a combined total of 31 wickets.

In the seasons that followed, Khan performed better, taking 55 wickets in 2005 before recording 34 the season after, despite missing almost half of it through injury. In December 2006, Khan was awarded British citizenship, which made him eligible to be selected for England. It only took one month for the English selectors to recognise him, when they named him as part of a 14-man England 'A' squad to tour Bangladesh. Subsequently, he was named in the 30-man World Cup squad, although he was not selected in the final squad when it was halved to 15.

At the end of February 2007, it was revealed that Khan had been ruled out for the entire 2007 season, after having surgery on his cruciate ligaments. However, following the 2008 season, Khan was named as one of the members of the "Development squad" of fringe players, to be sent to India as back-ups to the main England squad, because he had "impressed with his pace and swing".

He gave away 16 runs in his first and only over during the Twenty20 Cup Semi-final, where Marcus Trescothick smashed four successive boundaries.
Khan joined Sussex for the 2011 season replacing Corey Collymore

On 20 March 2014, Sussex announced they had released Khan after his 2013 season was disrupted by injury.

International career

Early years with Denmark
Khan played for the Denmark under-19s at the 1998 Under-19 Cricket World Cup in South Africa. He made his senior debut for Denmark at the age of 17, against Ireland at the 1998 European Cricket Championship. He was the youngest national team player in Danish history. In his next game, against Scotland, he took 3/34.

At the 2001 ICC Trophy, Khan took 16 wickets from nine matches with best figures of 3/11. He also scored 73 runs against Hong Kong in the opening game of the tournament.

England
In November 2008, Khan was called up (along with Sajid Mahmood) to act as cover for Stuart Broad and Andrew Flintoff during the One Day International series in India. He never actually joined up with the one-day squad due to the Mumbai terrorist attacks, which forced the cancellation of the rest of the series. However, he was subsequently called up to the Test squad in place of the injured Ryan Sidebottom for the two-match series that followed.

On 18 February 2009, Khan, along with Ravi Bopara, was invited to join the England Test squad on their tour of the West Indies as cover for Andrew Flintoff who was struggling with a hip injury.

Khan played in his only Test in the fifth Test against the West Indies on 6 March 2009. His first over consisted of 9 balls, which included 3 no-balls, costing 7 runs. Khan took his only Test wicket early on the third day of the Test, trapping in-form batsman Ramnaresh Sarwan LBW. He was reprimanded by the match referee for excessive appealing. When it was announced that fast-bowler Ryan Sidebottom would be unable to play in the ODIs or T20s following the Test series because of a recurring injury, Khan was named as his replacement.

Return to Denmark
Khan returned to play for Denmark at the 2014 ICC World Cricket League Division Four in Singapore. Khan captained Denmark in the 2016 ICC World Cricket League Division Four in Los Angeles, after team captain Michael Pedersen left the tournament to attend to a family emergency. In October 2021, he was named in Denmark's T20I squad for the Regional Final of the 2021 ICC Men's T20 World Cup Europe Qualifier tournament. He made his T20I debut for Denmark on 15 October 2021 against Italy. This came over 12 years after his sole T20I appearance for England in 2009, setting a new record for the longest gap between T20I appearances. However, his record was surpassed by Bermuda's Kyle Hodsoll the following month.

Legal career
Khan is a barrister and in 2022 represented former cricket Jahid Ahmed in his case against Essex.

See also
 One Test Wonder
 List of Test cricketers born in non-Test playing nations

References

External links

English cricketers
Danish cricketers
England Test cricketers
England Twenty20 International cricketers
Denmark Twenty20 International cricketers
Kent cricketers
1980 births
Living people
Danish emigrants to the United Kingdom
Danish people of Pakistani descent
British people of Pakistani descent
British Asian cricketers
Sussex cricketers
Sportspeople from Copenhagen
Dual international cricketers
Danish cricket captains
Naturalised citizens of the United Kingdom
NBC Denis Compton Award recipients